Jesse E. Johnson (born 1989 or 1990) is an American educator, politician, and former member of the Washington House of Representatives.

Johnson represents Washington's 30th legislative district, which encompasses parts of King County and Pierce County. He was appointed to the legislature in January 2020 following the resignation of Representative Kristine Reeves.

Prior to his appointment, Johnson served as a member of the Federal Way, Washington City Council.

Johnson retained his seat and was elected to a full two-year term in November 2020. In 2022, Johnson announced he would not seek another term in order to focus on his young family, which included a 6-month old and wife in medical school. His term ended in January 2023, and he was replaced by Kristine Reeves, who reclaimed the seat she had resigned three years earlier. Reeves defeated Ashli Tagoai (R) in the November 2022 election.

Electoral history

References 

1990s births
Year of birth uncertain
Living people
African-American state legislators in Washington (state)
Democratic Party members of the Washington House of Representatives
21st-century American politicians
21st-century African-American politicians